Melli (also Romanized as Mellī) is a village in Chenaran Rural District, in the Central District of Chenaran County, Razavi Khorasan Province, Iran. At the 2006 census, its population was 481, in 109 families.

References 

Populated places in Chenaran County